Jebel is a commune in Timiș County, Romania. It is composed of a single village, Jebel, and also included Pădureni village until 2004, when it was split off to form a separate commune.

History 

Jebel was first mentioned in papal tithes in 1334 under the name Zephel. In 1401, the local nobleman Nicolae Trentul had a fortress here, which had to be demolished later, and in 1425 the fortress was rebuilt in the nearby forest. At that time it had the right to organize fairs and owned several floating mills on Timiș River. In 1479 it was sold to Miklós and Jakab Bánffy.

Turkish traveler Evliya Çelebi, who has passed through Asia, Africa and Europe, noted various information related to the journeys he had made, describing it in ten volumes. In 1660, he, together with Ali, the Turk in charge with Timișoara region, visits Jebel and describes the village as being inhabited by Christian Romanians, as all the villages of Banat. The Jebel area, under the Turkish occupation, is represented as having large reserves of grain, livestock, forests and vast stretches of fruit trees. In 1717, after the conquest of Banat by the Austrians, the first census was organized, the village of Schebell being registered with 200 houses. Under the new administration the locality developed, and in 1761 it also had a post office. In 1752 the Orthodox church was built, which replaced the old wooden church and around which the village later developed. Not being colonized as intensely as other villages, it was for a long time the largest Romanian and Orthodox commune in Banat, with five parishes. During the Revolutions of 1848, the Serbs rebel and cause serious damage to the village. As a result, the inhabitants of Jebel rose against the Serbs, joining the hosts of Lajos Kossuth. In 1863, due to a severe drought, the village suffered from famine. In 1869, it experienced heavy flooding for several days.

On 4 June 1920, Banat was divided into three parts as a result of the Treaty of Trianon. The largest, eastern part, to which Jebel also belongs, fell to the Kingdom of Romania. In the context of World War II, on 19 September 1939, the talks between the Romanian Foreign Minister Grigore Gafencu and his Yugoslav counterpart Aleksandar Cincar-Marković on the establishment of a neutral zone in the Balkans were held in a carriage at the Jebel train station.

Demographics 

Jebel had a population of 3,584 inhabitants at the 2011 census, down 4% from the 2002 census. Most inhabitants are Romanians (88.28%), larger minorities being represented by Roma (4.05%) and Hungarians (1.14%). For 5.58% of the population, ethnicity is unknown. By religion, most inhabitants are Orthodox (76.23%), but there are also minorities of Pentecostals (11.69%), Baptists (2.12%) and Roman Catholics (1.79%). For 6.81% of the population, religious affiliation is unknown.

Education 
The first school in Jebel was established in 1750. In 1763 the archpriest Martin Șuboni (1716–1763) donated his own house to function as a school. The confessional school functioned in his house until 1919, when it passed into the state administration. The current school in Jebel is named after the archpriest. The building was located in the courtyard of the Orthodox church. The current school was built between 1937–1941.

Healthcare 
In Jebel there are two dispensaries, two pharmacies and a veterinary office. A psychiatric hospital has been operating here since 1962.

Notes

References 

Communes in Timiș County
Localities in Romanian Banat